Lester L. Grabbe is a retired American scholar and Emeritus Professor of Hebrew Bible and Early Judaism at the University of Hull, England. As an historian of ancient Judaism, he has authored several standard treatments. He founded and convenes the European Seminar on Methodology in Israel's History, and publishes the proceedings in the sub-series European Seminar in Historical Methodology. Before retirement, he established and taught for several years a module, Anti-Semitism and the Holocaust, and another module, Religious Sectarianism in History and the Modern World.

Life 

An alumnus of Claremont Graduate University, he was a student of William H. Brownlee and frequent guest on both Viking Radio and Radio Humberside to discuss such topics as: the Ten Commandments, the Jewish festivals, the 4th of July, and Nostradamus and the millennium. Grabbe delivered the 2008 Brownlee Memorial Lecture on the topic: Exit David and Solomon? The Current Debate on the History of Ancient Israel.

Festschrift 

At age sixty-five, Grabbe was presented with a Festschrift, a memorial book, by editors Philip Davies and Diana Edelman, containing a collection of thirty essays by his colleagues and friends, offering "reflections on the practice and theory of history writing, on the current controversies and topics of major interest". The essays show Grabbe's influence on the field of biblical studies and history.

Published works
As of October 2013, Grabbe had: 95 works in 234 publications in 3 languages and 7,650 library holdings listed in WorldCat.

Selected Titles
Israel in transition : from late Bronze II to Iron IIa (c. 1250-850 B.C.E.) (2008)  (Review)
Can a 'history of Israel' be written? 
A History of the Jews and Judaism in the Second Temple Period 1: Yehud: A History of the Persian Province of Judah (London/New York: T & T Clark International, 2004) xxi + 471 pp. .
Judaism from Cyrus to Hadrian: Vol. I: Persian and Greek Periods; Vol. II: Roman Period (Minneapolis: Fortress Press, 1992) lx + 722 pp. British edition in one-volume paperback (London: SCM, 1994) xxxv + 722 pp. (Fortress)  (v. 1);  (v. 2).
Exile and restoration revisited essays on the Babylonian and Persian periods in memory of Peter R. Ackroyd
Leading captivity captive : "the Exile" as history and ideology 
Judaic Religion in the Second Temple Period: Belief and Practice from the Exile to Yavneh (London/New York: Routledge, 2000) xix + 424 pp. 
Etymology in Early Jewish Interpretation: The Hebrew Names in Philo (Brown Judaic Studies 115; Atlanta: Scholars Press, 1988) xvi + 268 pp. 
Ancient Israel : what do we know and how do we know it? (2007, rev. ed 2017) 

Works on Second Temple Judaism
Priests, Prophets, Diviners, Sages: A Socio-historical Study of Religious Specialists in Ancient Israel (Valley Forge, PA: Trinity Press International, 1995) xviii + 261 pp. 
An Introduction to First Century Judaism (1996 Grabbe), 
Wisdom of Solomon (1997 Grabbe), 
Ezra and Nehemiah (Readings; London: Routledge, 1998) x + 209 pp. ,  (paper)
 
 
 
An Introduction to Second Temple Judaism : history and religion of the Jews in the time of Nehemiah, the Maccabees, Hillel and Jesus (2010 Grabbe),

References

External links
 Lester L. Grabbe's on Academia.edu

1945 births
Living people
American biblical scholars
21st-century American historians
American male non-fiction writers
Historians of Jews and Judaism
21st-century American male writers
Presidents of the Society for Old Testament Study